Hamad-ul-Hasan (born 2 April 1988) is a Pakistani first-class cricketer who played for Peshawar cricket team.

References

External links
 

1988 births
Living people
Pakistani cricketers
Peshawar cricketers
Cricketers from Peshawar